Georgia Chenevix-Trench  (born 8 February 1959) is an Australian cancer researcher who investigates genetic predispositions to cancer.

Chenevix-Trench was born in Nairobi, Kenya. She received her undergraduate degree (BSc(Hons)) in 1980 from the Department of Genetics at Trinity College in Ireland and was subsequently awarded her PhD in 1985 from the Department of Human Genetics at the Medical College of Virginia, USA. and in 1986 she commenced her post-doctoral work there. In 1989 she moved to Australia where she started working as a research officer at the Queensland Institute of Medical Research (QIMR). She currently works at the QIMR Berghofer Medical Research Institute, where she heads a cancer genetics research lab.

Chenevix-Trench has published over 400 papers in peer reviewed journals and has been actively involved in science education and communication.

She was elected to the Australian Academy of Science in 2014, for her work on the genetics of breast, ovarian and other cancers, including showing that mutations in the ATM gene confer moderate risks for breast cancer. In 2015 she was elected Fellow of the Australian Academy of Health and Medical Sciences. She was awarded the Suzanne Cory Medal and Lecture by the Australian Academy of Science in 2022.

References

1959 births
Living people
Australian women scientists
Academics from Brisbane
Fellows of the Australian Academy of Science
Alumni of Trinity College Dublin
Medical College of Virginia alumni
Fellows of the Australian Academy of Health and Medical Sciences